Santiago Echavarría Passos (born 25 January 1999) is a Colombian football player who currently plays for Las Vegas Lights in the USL Championship as a forward.

References

External links

1999 births
Living people
Colombian footballers
Colombian expatriate footballers
Las Vegas Lights FC players
Association football forwards
USL Championship players
Footballers from Medellín